The University of Lisbon (ULisboa;) is a public research university in Lisbon, and the largest university in Portugal. It was founded in 2013, from the merger of two previous public universities located in Lisbon, the former University of Lisbon (1911–2013) and the Technical University of Lisbon (1930–2013).

History
The first Portuguese university was established in Lisbon between 1288 and 1290, when Dinis I promulgated the letter Scientiae thesaurus mirabili, granting several privileges to the students of the studium generale in Lisbon, proving that it was already founded on that date. There was an active participation in this educational activity by the Portuguese Crown and its king, through its commitment of part of the subsidy of the same, as by the fixed incomes of the Church. This institution moved several times between Lisbon and Coimbra, where it settled permanently in 1537.

The current University of Lisbon is the result of the merger of two former public universities of Lisbon, the former University of Lisbon, founded in 1911 and the Technical University of Lisbon, founded in 1930. The merger process was initiated in 2011 and was made into law on 31 December 2012. As stated on the decree-law No. 266-E/2012, the new University of Lisbon began its legal existence on the day the newly elected rector took office, on 25 July 2013.

Predecessors
 University of Lisbon (1911–2013)
 Technical University of Lisbon (1930-2013)

Organization
As of 2013, the University of Lisbon comprises eighteen schools and its research institutes:
 Faculdade de Arquitetura (FA) - School of Architecture
 Faculdade de Belas-Artes (FBA) -  School of Fine Arts
 Faculdade de Ciências (FC) - School of Sciences
 Faculdade de Direito (FD) - School of Law
 Faculdade de Farmácia (FF) - School of Pharmacy
 Faculdade de Letras (FL) - School of Letters
 Faculdade de Medicina (FM) - School of Medicine
 Faculdade de Medicina Dentária (FMD) - School of Dental Medicine
 Faculdade de Medicina Veterinária (FMV) - School of Veterinary Medicine
 Faculdade de Motricidade Humana (FMH) - School of Human Motricity
 Faculdade de Psicologia (FP) - School of Psychology
 Instituto de Ciências Sociais (ICS) - Institute of Social Sciences
 Instituto de Educação (IE) - Institute of Education
 Instituto de Geografia e Ordenamento do Território (IGOT) - Institute of Geography and Territorial Planning 
 Instituto Superior de Agronomia (ISA) - School of Agronomy
 Instituto Superior de Ciências Sociais e Políticas (ISCSP) - School of Social and Political Sciences
 Instituto Superior de Economia e Gestão (ISEG) - School of Economy and Management
 Instituto Superior Técnico (IST) - School of Engineering

It also comprises six specialized units, social and shared services, and the Lisbon University Stadium.

Notable students or professors

Rankings 

According to the Academic Ranking of World Universities 2017, also known as Shanghai Ranking, the University of Lisbon is ranked first in Portugal and 151–200 (overall) in the world. In the broad subject field of Engineering/Technology and Computer Sciences the university is ranked 51–75 worldwide, while in the disciplines of Mathematics, Physics and Computer Science it is ranked 101–150, 151–200 and 151–200, respectively.

In the Times Higher Education World University Rankings (THE) 2017 the University of Lisbon is regarded as the largest university in Portugal and is ranked 401–500 (overall), while in the QS World University Rankings 2018 it is ranked 305 (overall).

See also
 List of universities in Portugal
 Higher education in Portugal
Flora-On

References

External links

  
  

 
2013 establishments in Portugal
Universities and colleges formed by merger